Selce is a village and municipality in the Poltár District in the Banská Bystrica Region of Slovakia. In the village there is a food store and a neoclassical evangelical church from the 19th century.

References

External links
 
 
http://www.e-obce.sk/obec/selcept/selce.html
http://www.citypopulation.de/php/slovakia-banskobystrickykraj.php?cityid=515515

Villages and municipalities in Poltár District